Wang Qianyi (born 16 January 1997) is a Chinese synchronised swimmer. She won a gold medal (China's first ever) and a silver medal at the 2017 World Aquatics Championships.

She is the younger twin sister of Wang Liuyi who is also her teammate.

References
集体自由组合高分加冕 中国花游首夺世锦赛冠军！
这对“姐妹花”世锦赛夺冠归来 深圳这个区都为之沸腾了！

Living people
Chinese synchronized swimmers
1997 births
World Aquatics Championships medalists in synchronised swimming
Synchronized swimmers at the 2017 World Aquatics Championships
Chinese twins
Sportspeople from Shenzhen
Synchronized swimmers from Guangdong
Asian Games gold medalists for China
Medalists at the 2018 Asian Games
Artistic swimmers at the 2018 Asian Games
Asian Games medalists in artistic swimming
Artistic swimmers at the 2019 World Aquatics Championships
Synchronized swimmers at the 2020 Summer Olympics
Olympic synchronized swimmers of China
Olympic silver medalists for China
Olympic medalists in synchronized swimming
Medalists at the 2020 Summer Olympics
Artistic swimmers at the 2022 World Aquatics Championships